Sekyedumase is a town in the Ashanti Region of Ghana. The town is known for the Sekyedumase Secondary School. Stone deposits are also found in Sekyedumase. In all case, the minerals are not properly explored.  The school is a second cycle institution.

References

Populated places in the Ashanti Region